Harivansh Narayan Singh (born 30 June 1956) is an Indian journalist and politician, who is the Deputy Chairperson of the Rajya Sabha, the upper house of the Indian Parliament. He is a Member of Parliament in the Rajya Sabha representing Bihar.

Early life
He did his graduate and post graduate in Economics from Banaras Hindu University and also holds Diploma in Journalism. He resides at Ranchi.

Journalistic career
He has worked in several different media publications through his career, starting with The Times of India. He served as an additional media advisor to former Prime Minister Chandra Shekhar. He joined the then obscure and nearly dead Hindi publication Prabhat Khabar in 1989, and scaled it to become one of the top newspapers in India, in terms of circulation. The newspaper was known for investigating many high-profile stories, including the Fodder scam.

Political career
In 2014, the Janata Dal (United) nominated Singh to the Rajya Sabha from the state of Bihar for a six-year term. On 8 August 2018, he was elected as Deputy Chairman of the Rajya Sabha for a six-year term as the candidate of the National Democratic Alliance, winning the election by a vote of 125 to 105 against the opposition candidate. He is the third person ever and first in forty years to hold this post who is not from the Indian National Congress. He was re-elected as the deputy chairman of the Rajya Sabha on 14 September 2020 after he returned to the Rajya Sabha for his second term from Bihar.

References

Janata Dal (United) politicians
1956 births
Living people
Rajya Sabha members from Bihar
People from Ranchi
People from Bhagalpur district
Jharkhand politicians
Hindi journalists
Deputy Chairman of the Rajya Sabha